Vincent Aviation was an airline based in Wellington, New Zealand. It operated air charter, freight and subcontract flights with a hub at Wellington International Airport. It was founded by Peter Vincent in 1992.  On 28 May 2014 the Australian business (Vincent Aviation Australia) was placed into receivership. On 24 October 2014 the New Zealand division was placed into receivership.

History

Vincent briefly operated a helicopter shuttle service from Wellington to Picton using a Bell 212. Vincent used a re-engined Riley Heron for wine-trail charters from Wellington to Blenheim. It was intended to use this aircraft for a service to the Chatham Islands, but this never eventuated. In the late 1990s, the airline acquired three Cessna 402Cs which were used on small freight contracts and overflow work from DHL. They also briefly operated a PA34 Seneca as well as a Beech Baron on similar work. In 2002 Vincent won a contract to fly UN peace keepers to East Timor using a Reims F406. Before long Vincent acquired its first Beech 1900C for use on this contract, with a D model following. From that first UN contract, the Darwin-based side of the business grew quickly, picking up contracts throughout the NT, mainly serving the resources sector. At its peak the Darwin base operated up to nine Beech 1900C/Ds. In the early/mid-2000s, Vincent's first two Beech 1900s (ZK-VAE and -VAB) were used for Air New Zealand flights from Christchurch to Blenheim and Wellington to Palmerston North. Later a Dash 8-100 was acquired by the New Zealand business for charter work. For some time this aircraft was used heavily by Air Nelson to operate Air New Zealand services. In more recent times Vincent NZ have acquired four Jetstreams and a BAe 146-200.

Services

Vincent Aviation serves primarily as a charter airline. Its former scheduled passenger services in Australia were to Groote Eylandt and Cairns from Darwin, Narrabri from Sydney and regular charter flights from Darwin to Kununurra, Bootu Creek, Jabiru, Fortescue/Christmas Creek and from Brisbane to Roma.  Vincent has also done work in Japan, Ireland, Malaysia, Myanmar and Indonesia. For a few months it operated scheduled flights from Darwin to Dili, Timor Leste, but these ceased early in 2012.

Vincent Aviation's air charter business in New Zealand currently operates one British Aerospace Jetstream 32EP exclusively for LifeFlight based in Wellington on air ambulance duties and a further two Jetstream 32EPs and one British Aerospace Jetstream 31 on charter services throughout New Zealand. Vincent has a contract to transport inmates around New Zealand for the Corrections Department.
Airways New Zealand awarded Vincent the contract to provide air capability for the calibration of instrument approach aids throughout New Zealand. In August 2014 Vincent was chosen by the local Wairarapa council to operate a scheduled service from Masterton Hood Aerodrome to Auckland using a Saab 340B. The aircraft will be based overnight at Masterton and flights are expected to commence in the later stages of 2014.

Fleet

As of August 2014, the Vincent Aviation fleet consisted of the following aircraft:
Wellington, New Zealand based fleet

Vincent Aviation Australia 

On Wednesday 28 May 2014, Andrew Fielding and Gerald Collins of BDO Business Recovery & Insolvency (Qld) Pty Ltd were appointed Receivers and Managers of Vincent Aviation (Australia). The Receivers and Managers ceased trading while an urgent assessment of the business and its operations is undertaken.  Accordingly, all flights were cancelled and passengers told to seek alternative travel arrangements.

See also
 List of defunct airlines of New Zealand
 History of aviation in New Zealand
 List of defunct airlines of Australia

References

External links

  
Fleet Details on AviationPage New Zealand

Defunct airlines of New Zealand
Airlines established in 1992